Palm Cove is a suburb of Cairns in the Cairns Region, Queensland, Australia.

It is named after the palm trees that line the beach.

Geography 
Palm Cove is located in Far North Queensland on the Australian coast. It has a long sandy beach along most of its seafront except for the rocky headland around Buchan Point in the north of the suburb.

The reef shelters the inshore waters from the Coral Sea swells creating relatively calm waters between the reef and the beach. To the west of Palm Cove is the Macalister Range National Park which is part of the Wet Tropics World Heritage Area.

Since Palm Cove is located in a tropical climate, the average summer temperature is between 24 and 33 degrees Celsius; average winter temperature is between 14 and 26 degrees Celsius.

Buchan is a town in the north of the locality. It was named in 1965 after Mount Buchan, which in turn was named by explorer George Elphinstone Dalrymple on  20 October 1873, after Buchan in Aberdeenshire, Scotland. The use of the name Buchan has fallen into disuse over the years.

History 
Palm Cove is situated in the Djabugay (Tjapukai) traditional Aboriginal country.

The first documented British visit to the area was by a coastal expedition led by George Elphinstone Dalrymple in 1873. Dalrymple's group had stopped in the area for a few days and accessed a large lagoon at Palm Cove. Immediately after landing a large number of Aboriginal people came out of their camps, and attempted to prevent the groups passage to the lagoon. It was only when the Aboriginal people were poised to throw their spears that they were repulsed by gunfire. After discovering the "unmistakable evidences of wholesale habitual cannibalism", such as "roasted and partially eaten bodies" in the camps of the Aboriginal people, all of the group "heartily rejoiced at the severe lesson which their unwarrantable hostility had brought upon them".

Shortly before World War I in 1918, the land that is today Palm Cove was bought by Albert Veivers from Archdeacon Campbell. Archdeacon Campbell had been known as a priest at Cairns church who experimented with bringing different agricultural crops to the Cairns region. Veivers was important in the advancement of Palm Cove by having the first road built. The creation of the road led property values in Palm Cove to increase dramatically, leading to more prosperity for the community.

Shortly after World War II, in which Palm Cove was used as a training base for Australian soldiers, the number of people travelling to Palm Cove greatly increased.

The opening of the Ramada Reef Resort in 1986 marked the first international hotel chain to be located in Palm Cove and the area has continued to increase in national and international recognition ever since.

Economy
The major industry for Palm Cove is the Accommodation and Food Services sector which relates to tourism. 21.2% of residents were employed in this sector in 2011

Education 
There are no schools in Palm Cove. The nearest government primary school is Trinity Beach State School in Trinity Beach to the south. The nearest government secondary school is Smithfield State High School in Smithfield to the south.

Amenities
Due to the small size of Palm Cove and its tourism focus, the focus is on the provision of tourist services rather than household needs. There are two general stores and many restaurants. The nearest shopping centre is at Clifton Beach.

Attractions 

Palm Cove is also a tourist destination due to its proximity to the Great Barrier Reef and the Daintree Rainforest. Palm Cove is the location of many resorts and apartments. The pristine beaches and palm tree lined paths are used by joggers, walkers and cyclists and netted life guard patrol swimming enclosures offer safe access to the sea all year round. The Palm Cove jetty is one of the regions most popular fishing spots where anglers regularly catch species such as mackerel, Giant Trevally or "G.T's" and shark.

Transport 
The closest major airport to Palm Cove is the Cairns International Airport in Aeroglen to the south. The only method of direct transportation to Palm Cove is along the Captain Cook Highway which stretches from Cairns in the south to Mossman in the north. Buses also link Palm Cove to local suburbs.

References

External links

 
 

Suburbs of Cairns